Amin Dhillon is a Canadian on-air host, producer, podcaster, and emcee. She is a former Miss India Worldwide Canada.

Early life 

Amin Dhillon was born in Winnipeg, Manitoba, Canada to an immigrant family from Punjab, India. At the age of 3, Dhillon lost her father to cancer and since then has hosted various fundraising events in support of the Canadian Cancer Society. She graduated from the University of Manitoba, with a degree in commerce.

Career 

Prior to her media career, Dhillon was a former beauty queen becoming the first woman from Winnipeg to win the title of Miss India Worldwide Canada. She represented Canada at the Miss India Worldwide pageant, placing TOP 10 overall.

As of 2011, she is the entertainment and news reporter of the Asian Television Network (ATN). Dhillon spent a decade covering national news and events for Canada's Indo-Canadian community.

She is also one of Canada's leading emcees for various cultural and community events  Some of the high-profile events Dhillon has hosted include Markham South Asian Festival, Indo-Canadian Awards, Miss India Worldwide Canada pageant, Miss India Carrassauga pageant, Canada's largest India Day celebrations at Nathan Phillips Square and at Yonge and Dundas Square, Pam Am Games Globalfest, Mosaic Festival, Bollywood Monster Mashup, Vibrant Brampton, Diwali Gala, Global Gujarati Awards, Festival of South Asia, and the Indo-Canada Chamber of Commerce Awards.

In 2019, Dhillon launched her own podcast and digital series "In Conversation with Amin Dhillon". With a focus on promoting diversity and inclusion, the podcast has featured politicians, newsmakers, artists, and entrepreneurs with inspirational stories of success and achievement.

Politics 
In April 2021, Dhillon announced she would be seeking the federal Liberal nomination in Brampton Centre.

Notable guests and interviews

Music

 Jaz Dhami                                              
 Arjun                           
 Jonita Gandhi
 Aaman Trikha
 Satinder Sartaaj
 Parichay
 Rup Magon
 Neeti Mohan
 Raja Kumari
 Raghav
 Sunny Brown
 Jay Sean
 Chloe Flower
 Nikhita Gandhi
 Jatin Pandit
 Amaal Malik

Actors and actresses

 Pallavi Sharda
 Uppekha Jain

YouTube and reality TV stars

 Aparna Shewakramani from Indian Matchmaking
 Zaid Ali
 Priyanka and Poonam Shah
 Rupan Bal
 Siera Bearchell

Entrepreneurs

 Manny Kohli
 Dee Murthy
 KJ Dhaliwal
 Mani Jassal
 Lisa Sohanpal
 Ritu Bhasin
 Samra Zafar
 Roxy Earle
 Rakhi Mutta

Athletes and politicians

 Tiger Ali Singh
 Patrick Brown

References

External links 
 Official Website

Living people
People from Winnipeg
Canadian beauty pageant winners
Canadian people of Indian descent
Canadian people of Punjabi descent
University of Manitoba alumni
Punjabi people
1985 births
Canadian television personalities